The 2000 Mississippi State Bulldogs football team represented Mississippi State University during the 2000 NCAA Division I-A football season. The team's head coach was Jackie Sherrill. The Bulldogs played their home games in 2000 at Scott Field in Starkville, Mississippi.

Schedule

Rankings

References

Mississippi State
Mississippi State Bulldogs football seasons
Independence Bowl champion seasons
Mississippi State Bulldogs football